Zorakert is a village in the Amasia Municipality of the Shirak Province of Armenia.

Demographics
According to 1912 publication of Kavkazskiy kalendar, there was a mainly Karapapakhs population of 398 in the village of Balykhly of the Kars Okrug of the Kars Oblast.

The population of the village since 1886 is as follows:

References 

Populated places in Shirak Province